Robert Chandler Greenwood (March 13, 1928 – September 1, 1994), nicknamed "Greenie", was a Mexican professional baseball right-handed pitcher, who played in Major League Baseball (MLB) for the Philadelphia Phillies, during the  and  seasons. Greenwood attended Oakland Technical High School and Saint Mary's College of California.

A native of Cananea, Sonora, Greenwood's pro baseball career lasted for 11 seasons (1949–1956; 1958–1960) and included 12 big league games pitched. He posted a 1–2 won–lost record and a 3.92 earned run average (ERA) in 39 MLB innings pitched, allowing 35 hits, and 18 bases on balls, with nine strikeouts. Of Greenwood’s 12 appearances, four were as a starting pitcher. He recorded no complete games or saves.

In Greenwood’s lone major league victory, on July 31, 1954, at Connie Mack Stadium, he went eight innings, allowing only five hits and two earned runs against the St. Louis Cardinals, but exited the game for pinch hitter Stan Lopata in the bottom of the eighth frame, with the Phils trailing, 5–4. Lopata then hit a two-run home run to put Philadelphia ahead, 6–5, and relief pitcher Murry Dickson held the Cardinals scoreless in the ninth to save Greenwood's victory.

See also
List of Major League Baseball players from Mexico

References

External links

Bob Greenwood at  Baseball Almanac

1928 births
1994 deaths
Asheville Tourists players
Baltimore Orioles (IL) players
Baseball players from Sonora
Chattanooga Lookouts players
Saint Mary's Gaels baseball players
Major League Baseball pitchers
Major League Baseball players from Mexico
Mayos de Navojoa players
Mexican people of Irish descent
Miami Marlins (IL) players
People from Cananea
Philadelphia Phillies players
Phoenix Senators players
Salt Lake City Bees players
San Diego Padres (minor league) players
San Francisco Seals (baseball) players
Tri-City Braves players
Tulsa Oilers (baseball) players